Lameck Aguta Orero (born October 10, 1971) is a former Kenyan marathon runner. He was the winner of the 101st Boston Marathon in 1997 with a time of 2:10:34 hours. He also competed in the men's marathon at the 1996 Summer Olympics.

Biography
Aguta's personal best time in any marathon is 2:10:03 hours, achieved at the 1996 Boston Marathon. He finished fourth in that race, which was the 100th running of the Boston Marathon. His best time in the half marathon is 1:00:55 hours at the 1992 IAAF World Half Marathon Championships in South Shields, England.

Three months after winning the 1997 Boston Marathon, Aguta was the victim of a vicious robbery in his home country of Kenya during which he was clubbed in the back of the head after emerging from an auto accident. Thieves made off with approximately $10,000 of Aguta's earnings. He was in a coma for three months and nearly died. He would spend years struggling to move again. His health did improve and he attempted a comeback at racing by 2003. He ran the Dallas White Rock Marathon in 2004 before attempting to run Boston again in 2005. His time in the White Rock Marathon of 2004 was 2:34:04 and is considered a respectable time but not an elite time.

Achievements

References

External links

https://web.archive.org/web/20061016164658/http://arrs.net/AL_HMar.htm

1971 births
Living people
Kenyan male long-distance runners
Kenyan male marathon runners
Athletes (track and field) at the 1994 Commonwealth Games
Commonwealth Games gold medallists for Kenya
Boston Marathon male winners
Commonwealth Games medallists in athletics
Athletes (track and field) at the 1996 Summer Olympics
Olympic athletes of Kenya
Medallists at the 1994 Commonwealth Games